Minuscule 1739 (per Gregory-Aland numbering), α 78 (per von Soden), is a Greek minuscule manuscript of the New Testament, on 102 parchment leaves (23 cm by 17.5 cm). It is dated paleographically to the 10th century.

Description 

The codex contains the text of the Acts of the Apostles, Catholic epistles, and Pauline epistles. The text is written in one column per page, 35 lines per page. The Epistle to the Hebrews is placed before 1 Timothy. It contains scholia, lectionary markings were added by a later hand. 

It contains a large number of notes drawn from early church fathers (Irenaeus, Clement, Origen, Eusebius, and Basil), but none later than Basil (329-379 CE), suggesting a relatively early date for 1739's exemplar. The text of this manuscript often agrees with p46 and Codex Vaticanus. A colophon indicates that while copying the Pauline epistles, the scribe followed a manuscript that contained text edited by Origen.

At the end of the Second Epistle to Timothy it has subscription προς τιμοθεον β' εγραφη απο ρωμης. The same subscription appears in manuscripts P, 6, 1881 et al.

Text 

The Greek text of this codex is a representative of the Alexandrian text-type. The Alands placed the text of the Epistles in Category I, but the text of the Acts in Category II.
It was not examined by the Claremont Profile Method.

Together with manuscripts 323, 630, 945, and 1891 it belongs to the textual Family 1739 (in the Acts). In the Pauline Epistles this family includes the following manuscripts: 0121a, 0243/0121b, 6, 424, 630 (in part), and 1881.

It contains Acts 8:37, as do the manuscripts Codex Laudianus, 323, 453, 945, 1891, 2818, and several others.

In Acts 8:39, instead of πνεῦμα κυρίου ἥρπασεν τὸν Φίλιππον ([The] Spirit of [the] Lord caught up Philip)), it has the interesting textual variant  ([the] Holy Spirit fell on the eunuch, and [the] angel of [the] Lord caught up Philip) supported by Codex Alexandrinus and several minuscule manuscripts: 94, 103, 307, 322, 323, 385, 453, 467, 945, 1765, 1891, 2298, 36a, itp, vg, syrh.

In Acts 12:25 it reads εξ Ιερουσαλημ εις Αντιοχειαν (from Jerusalem to Antioch) along with manuscripts 429, 945, e, p, syrp, copsa geo; majority reads εις Ιερουσαλημ (to Jerusalem);

In Acts 20:28 it reads του κυριου (of the Lord) together with the manuscripts 𝔓74, C*, D, E, Ψ, 33, 36, 453, 945, 1891. The other manuscripts have του θεου (of God) or του κυριου και του Θεου (of the Lord and God).

In 1 Corinthians 7:5 it reads τη προσευχη (prayer) along with 𝔓11, 𝔓46, א*, A, B, C, D, F, G, P, Ψ, 6, 33, 81, 104, 181, 629, 630, 1877, 1881, 1962, it vg, cop, arm, eth. Other manuscripts read τη νηστεια και τη προσευχη (fasting and prayer) or τη προσευχη και νηστεια (prayer and fasting).

In 1 Corinthians 15:54, along with Codex Sinaiticus, 614, 629, and 1877, the text lacks (although it has been added to the margin) το φθαρτον τουτο ενδυσηται αφθαρσιαν και (This corruptible shall put on incorruption). Other manuscripts that lack this phrase are 𝔓46, 088, 0121a, 0243, 1175, 1852, 1912, and 2200.

In a marginal note to the text of 1 John 5:6, a corrector added the reading δι' ὕδατος καὶ αἵματος καὶ πνεύματος (through water and blood and spirit) as found in the following: Codex Sinaiticus, Codex Alexandrinus, 104, 424c, 614, 2412, 2495, ℓ 598m, syrh, copsa, copbo, Origen. Bart D. Ehrman says this reading is an Orthodox corrupt reading.

History 

The manuscript was copied by a monk named Ephraim. He copied 1739 from an uncial exemplar from the 4th century. 
It was discovered by E. von der Goltz in 1897 at Mount Athos and is usually known by his name. A collation was made by Morton S. Enslin (in Kirsopp Lake Six Collations).

The codex is housed at the Great Lavra (B 184), in Athos.

See also 

 List of New Testament minuscules (1001–2000)
 Biblical manuscripts
 Textual criticism

Notes

References

Further reading 

 M.-J. Lagrange, "Critique textuelle II". Pages 470–471 in La Critique rationelle. Paris, 1935.
 Kim, K. W. "Codices 1582, 1739, and Origen". Journal of Biblical Literature 69 (1950): 167.
 J. Neville Birdsall, A Study of MS. 1739 and its Relationship to MSS. 6, 424, 1908, and M (unpublished Ph.D. dissertation, 1959)
 J. Neville Birdsall, Collected papers in Greek and Georgian textual criticism, Texts and Studies vol. 3, Gorgias Press LLC, 2006, p. 81.
 Günther Zuntz, Opuscula selecta; classica, hellenistica christiana, Manchester University Press ND, 1972, pp. 284-290.

External links 

 MS 1739 in Microfilm at the Library of Congress
 Minuscule 1739 at the Encyclopedia of Textual Criticism
 

Greek New Testament minuscules
10th-century biblical manuscripts
Athos manuscripts
Great Lavra